The Constitution Alteration (Legislative Powers) Bill 1910, was put to voters for approval in a referendum held in the 1911 referendums. The bill sought to alter the Australian Constitution to extend the Commonwealth power in respect of trade and commerce, the control of corporations, labour and employment and combinations and monopolies. All of the proposed changes were contained within the one question.

Question
Do you approve of the proposed law for the alteration of the Constitution entitled 'Constitution Alteration (Legislative Powers) 1910'?

The proposal was to alter the text of section 51 of the Constitution to read as follows:
51. The Parliament shall, subject to this Constitution, have Legislative power to make laws for the peace, order, and good government of the Commonwealth with respect to:
(i.) Trade and commerce with other countries, and among the States;
...
(xx.) Foreign corporations, and trading or financial corporations formed within the limits of the Commonwealth:
Corporations, including
(a) the creation, dissolution, regulation, and control of corporations;
(b) corporations formed under the law of a State (except any corporation formed solely for religious, charitable, scientific or artistic purposes, and not for the acquisition of gain by the corporation or its members), including their dissolution, regulation, and control ; and
(c) foreign corporations, including their regulation and control:
...
(xxxv.) Conciliation and arbitration for the prevention and settlement of industrial disputes extending beyond the limits of any one State:
Labour and employment, including
(a) the wages and conditions of labour and employment in any trade industry or calling; and
(b) the prevention and settlement of industrial disputes, including disputes in relation to employment on or about railways the property of any State':
...
(xl.) Combinations and monopolies in relation to the production, manufacture, or supply of goods or services.

Results
The referendum was not approved by a majority of voters, and a majority of the voters was achieved in only one state, Western Australia.Question: Do you approve of the proposed law for the alteration of the Constitution entitled 'Constitution Alteration (Legislative Powers) 1910'?

Discussion
This was the first of many times that similar questions were asked at a referendum. On every occasion the public decided not to vest power in the Commonwealth over these matters.
1913 referendum on trade and commerce
1919 referendum on  trade and commerce, corporations, industrial matters and trusts.
1926 referendum on Industry and Commerce.

See also
 Huddart, Parker & Co Pty Ltd v Moorehead
Politics of Australia
History of Australia

References

Further reading
  
 
 Australian Electoral Commission (2007) Referendum Dates and Results 1906 – Present AEC, Canberra.

1911 referendums
Referendum (Trade and Commerce)
1911 (Trade and Commerce)